Department of Housing' may refer to:

 California Department of Housing and Community Development, a department within the California Business, Consumer Services and Housing Agency that develops housing policy and building codes 
 Department of Housing, a former Australian government department )(1963-1973)
 Department of Housing and Construction (1973–75), an Australian government department
 Department of Housing and Construction (1978–82), an Australian government department
 Department of Housing and Construction (1983–87), an Australian government department
 Department of Housing and Public Works (version 2), a ministerial department within the Queensland Government
 Department of Housing and Regional Development, an Australian government department that existed between March 1994 and March 1996.
 Department of Housing and Urban Development (Iran)
 Department of Housing and Urban Development (Tamil Nadu), department of government of Tamil Nadu
 Department of Housing and Urban Planning, a department of government of Uttar Pradesh 
 Department of Housing, Local Government and Heritage, a department of the government of Ireland
 Department of Housing (South Africa)
 Maryland Department of Housing and Community Development
 New York City Department of Housing Preservation and Development, a department of the government of Maryland
 NSW Department of Housing, was an agency responsible for the provision and management of public housing services in the state of New South Wales, Australia.
 Puerto Rico Department of Housing, department responsible for homeownership, affordable housing, and community assistance programs in Puerto Rico
 Texas Department of Housing and Community Affairs, agency responsible for homeownership, affordable rental housing, community and energy assistance programs, and colonia activities serving primarily low income Texans.
 United States Department of Housing and Urban Development, the executive department of the United States federal government that administers federal housing and urban development laws